Lucifer is a painting completed in 1890 by the German artist Franz Stuck, one of the founders of the Munich Secession. The painting belongs to Stuck's "dark monumental" period, presenting an image of "man-demon". The canvas size is 161 x 152.5 cm.

History
Ferdinand I of Bulgaria bought the painting for the royal collection in Sofia, from Stuck's studio in Munich in 1891. On December 25, 1930, King Boris III added it to the National Museum and from 1948 it was part of the National Art Gallery. In 1985 it was transferred to the National Gallery for Foreign Art, and since 2015 the Fund Gallery "Square 500".

Exhibitions
The picture has been shown in numerous international exhibitions:

1972 - German art around 1900 in Berlin

2000 - The kingdom of the spirit. The development of the German symbolism 1870 – 1920 in Frankfurt, Birmingham and Stockholm

2005–2006 - History of melancholy in Paris and Berlin

2006–2007 - Franz von Stuck. The modern Lucifer in Trento

2008–2009 - Masterpieces of Franz von Stuck in Munich

2010 - Crime and Punishment in Paris

2021-2022 - Inferno in Rome

References

1890 paintings
Paintings by Franz von Stuck
Bulgarian royalty
Paintings depicting Hebrew Bible themes